Diving was contested from 8 October 2002 to 13 October 2002 at the 2002 Asian Games in Sajik Swimming Pool, Busan, South Korea. China dominated the competition winning all gold medals.

Schedule

Medalists

Men

Women

Medal table

Participating nations
A total of 49 athletes from 12 nations competed in diving at the 2002 Asian Games:

References
2002 Asian Games Report, Pages 233–244

External links
busanasiangames.org

 
2002 Asian Games events
2002
Asian Games
2002 Asian Games
International aquatics competitions hosted by South Korea